Bouliwel  is a town and sub-prefecture in the Mamou Prefecture in the Mamou Region of Guinea.

The sub-prefecture of Bouliwel is subdivided in the following districts:

References

Sub-prefectures of the Mamou Region